William Thomas Andrade (born January 25, 1964) is an American professional golfer who currently plays on the PGA Champions Tour. He was previously a member of the PGA Tour, where he was a four-time winner.

Early life 
Andrade was born  in Bristol, Rhode Island. He is an American Junior Golf Association (AJGA) alum and 1981 Rolex Junior Player of the Year.

He attended the Providence Country Day School for high school and then made his way to Wake Forest University where he helped lead the Demon Deacons to the 1986 NCAA Championship. He played on the U.S. team in the 1987 Walker Cup, and turned professional in the same year.

Professional career 
He has four wins on the PGA Tour: the 1991 Kemper Open and Buick Classic, the 1998 Bell Canadian Open, and the 2000 Invensys Classic. He was the first golfer to win on the PGA Tour using the ProV1 golf ball at the 2000 Invensys Classic at Las Vegas. He has been featured in the top 50 of the Official World Golf Ranking. Andrade continues to play on a limited basis, and finished T5 at the Sanderson Farms Championship on the PGA Tour in July 2013, earning $114,000. He became eligible to compete on the Champions Tour on January 25, 2014, when he turned 50 years old. He had exempt status on the Champions Tour due to his position on the career earnings money list and his multiple victories on the PGA Tour.

Charity contributions 
Andrade is also an active contributor to charity. He and fellow PGA Tour professional Brad Faxon received the Golf Writers of America's 1999 Charlie Bartlett Award for their "unselfish contributions to society", and the American Heart Association's 2002 Gold Heart Award in recognition of their charity efforts. Also in 2002, Andrade and Faxon were named winners of the 2002 Ambassadors of Golf Award. Together, they run Billy Andrade/Brad Faxon Charities for Children, Inc., a non-profit organization that, as of 2005, has donated over $3 million to needy children in Rhode Island and southern Massachusetts. Since 1999, Andrade and Faxon have also served as hosts of the CVS Charity Classic, a golf tournament held at the Rhode Island Country Club each June, whose proceeds benefit the two players' charity. Every fall Andrade and PGA Tour player Stewart Cink co-host the East Lake Invitational held at East Lake Golf Club which helps to benefit the East Lake Foundation. In 2022, Andrade received the Payne Stewart Award, given annually to a golfer who exemplifies Stewart's values of character, charitable efforts, and sportsmanship.

Personal life 
Andrade resides in Atlanta, Georgia, and Bristol, Rhode Island, with his wife, Jody, and their children Cameron and Grace. Unusual for a professional golfer, he is also a Democrat.

Amateur wins (4)
1981 Junior World Cup (with Sam Randolph)
1983 New England Amateur
1986 North and South Amateur, Sunnehanna Amateur

Professional wins (12)

PGA Tour wins (4)

PGA Tour playoff record (2–1)

Other wins (5)
1987 Rhode Island Open
1991 JCPenney Classic (with Kris Tschetter)
1992 Fred Meyer Challenge (with Tom Kite)
1999 Fred Meyer Challenge (with Brad Faxon)
2001 Fred Meyer Challenge (with Brad Faxon)

PGA Tour Champions wins (3)

PGA Tour Champions playoff record (1–3)

Results in major championships

CUT = missed the half-way cut
"T" indicates a tie for a place.

Summary

Most consecutive cuts made – 7 (1991 PGA – 1993 U.S. Open)
Longest streak of top-10s – 1 (three times)

Results in The Players Championship

CUT = missed the halfway cut
"T" indicates a tie for a place

Results in World Golf Championships

QF, R16, R32, R64 = Round in which player lost in match play

Results in senior major championships
Results not in chronological order before 2022.

"T" indicates a tie for a place
NT = No tournament due to COVID-19 pandemic

U.S. national team appearances
Amateur
Eisenhower Trophy: 1986
Walker Cup: 1987 (winners)

Professional
CVS Health Charity Classic: 2017 (winners), 2018 (winners)

See also
1987 PGA Tour Qualifying School graduates
1988 PGA Tour Qualifying School graduates

References

External links

American male golfers
Wake Forest Demon Deacons men's golfers
PGA Tour golfers
PGA Tour Champions golfers
Golfers from Rhode Island
People from Bristol, Rhode Island
Golfers from Atlanta
1964 births
Living people